Tornado Range is a 1948 American Western film directed by Ray Taylor and written by William Lively. The film stars Eddie Dean, Roscoe Ates, Jennifer Holt, George Chesebro, Buster Slaven and Marshall Reed. The film was released on February 21, 1948, by Eagle-Lion Films.

Plot

Cast          
Eddie Dean as Eddie Dean
Roscoe Ates as Soapy Jones
Jennifer Holt as Mary King
George Chesebro as Lance King
Buster Slaven as Jebby Sawyer 
Marshall Reed as Sam Wilson
Terry Frost as Thayer
Lane Bradford as Thorne
Russell Arms as Killer Dorgan aka Ben Colton
Steve Clark as Pop Sawyer
Andy Parker as Musician
Copper the Horse as Eddie's Horse

References

External links
 

1948 films
American Western (genre) films
1948 Western (genre) films
Producers Releasing Corporation films
Eagle-Lion Films films
Films directed by Ray Taylor
American black-and-white films
1940s English-language films
1940s American films